Boris Petrovich Vysheslavtsev (1877–1954) was a Russian philosopher who belonged to the Russian Silver Age and Renaissance of Religion and Philosophy.

Life 
He did his doctorate on Fichte in 1914 and became a lecturer, later professor in the philosophy of law at Moscow University. In September 1922, he became one of a group of prominent writers, scholars and intellectuals who were sent into forced exile on the so-called "philosophers' ships". He emigrated first to Berlin, then in 1924 to Paris. He spent most of his life at the Orthodox Theological Institute. While in Paris, he published the book The Ethics of a Transfigured Eros (1931). This book deals with the Christianisation of Freudian sublimation and is universally considered Vysheslavtsev's best work. He is noted for an attempt to apply concepts of depth psychology to ethics and to the interpretation of Christian doctrine.

Books 
Available in English translation:
 The Eternal in Russian Philosophy. Translated by Penelope V. Burt. Grand Rapids, MI, and Cambridge, U.K.: Eerdmans, 2002.

Further reading

References

External links 
 . "Vysheslavtsev, Boris Petrovich" article in the Routledge Encyclopedia of Philosophy

20th-century Russian philosophers
Eastern Orthodox philosophers
Soviet dissidents
Soviet expellees
1877 births
1954 deaths